Phillip Allen Hansen (born May 20, 1968) is a former American football defensive end in the National Football League (NFL) for the Buffalo Bills, drafted in the second round, making the 1991 all-rookie team, and playing on three Super Bowl teams. He played college football at North Dakota State University, setting records with 41 regular-season sacks and 32 pass breakups, and started on Division II national championship teams in 1988 and 1990. He accumulated 61.5 sacks for the Bills and was inducted onto the Buffalo Bills Wall of Fame on September 18, 2011.

In 2012, Hansen ran as a Republican for election to the Minnesota Senate in the newly created district 4. The district includes Detroit Lakes, where he lives. He lost a close race to former state representative Kent Eken.

References

1968 births
Living people
People from Dickey County, North Dakota
American football defensive ends
Buffalo Bills players
North Dakota State Bison football players